The International Geography Bee (IGB) is a geography quiz competition for students across the world. Overseen by International Academic Competitions, IGB is distinct from the International Geography Olympiad (iGeo) and National Geographic World Championship. The United States Geography Championships are also organized by IAC and focus on more "applied geographic knowledge" as compared to IGB. IGB currently hosts tournaments in five regions: Asia, Australia & New Zealand, Canada, Europe, and the United States. The highest level of competition is the IGB World Championships, which are hosted biennially in conjunction with the complementary International History Olympiad. The 2018 IGB Worlds were held in Berlin, Germany, and the 2020 IGB Worlds were cancelled due to the COVID-19 pandemic.

Regional Bees

United States

Varsity & JV

The first stage of competition for Varsity and Junior Varsity competitors is the National Qualifying Exam (NQE), which can also qualify a student for the US Geography Championships. The NQE is administered at regional sites of the National History Bee and Bowl; students can take the exam up to three times, on Set A, Set B, and/or Set C. Students who finish in the top 50% of test-takers at their regional site or who finish at or above the National Median Score for their version of the test are eligible for Nationals.

Competitors who finish in the top 50% of their age division at Nationals or who score 75 points or more on the NQE qualify for the International Geography Championships. The top 3 students at Nationals receive discounted admission at the next IGB Worlds.

Middle School & Elementary

Students in 8th grade and younger are permitted to compete in the Junior Varsity Division, but most compete in the 8th Grade, 7th Grade, 6th Grade, or Elementary Divisions, depending on their respective age. These four divisions all use the same qualifying exams for the US National Championships, but the minimum score required to advance varies—8th graders must score 50; 7th graders must score 45; 6th graders must score 40; and elementary students must score 35.

Middle and elementary school students also have the opportunity to compete in Regional Quiz Tournaments, offered at middle school History Bowl sites. These are not required for Nationals qualification and are not available to JV and Varsity competitors. The Middle and Elementary School pathway consists of an Online Regional Qualifying Exam (ORQE), Regional Finals, and then the National Championships.

US National Champions

Asia, Canada, & Europe

The International Geography Bees in Asia, Canada, and Europe have three levels: Regionals, the Asian/Canadian/European Championships, and the World Championships. At the Regional stage, students can compete in buzzer-based Regional Quiz Tournaments (similar to Regionals of the National History Bee and Bowl) or take the Championships Qualifying Exam. Students finishing in the top 50% on either the Alpha or Beta version of this exam qualify for Nationals; those finishing in the top 25% qualify for IGB Worlds.

Hosted in conjunction with the region's International History Bee and Bowl, the Asian/Canadian/European Championships consist of 3 preliminary rounds with 30 buzzer-based questions each. The top 50% in each age division—Varsity, JV, Middle School—at Nationals also qualify for the International Geography Championships.

Asian Champions

Canadian National Champions

European Champions

Due to the Covid-19 pandemic, the International Geography Bee European Championships were not held in 2020.

Other Regions

Qualifying exams and tournaments have also been offered in Australia & New Zealand and Africa. Australia & New Zealand do not currently have their own Championships for IGB, but interested students can compete in the IGB Asian Championships if they desire. Students in Latin American, the Caribbean, and Africa can take the IGB Championships Qualifying Exam, but there are not yet any tournaments hosted in these regions.

International Geography Championships

Qualification

Students within the United States can qualify for the International Geography Championships by finishing in the top 50% of competitors at the US National Championships of IGB; by finishing in the top 25% of competitors at Regional Quiz Tournaments; or by earning a score of at least 75 on the IGB National Qualifying Exam.

International students can qualify for IGC by finishing in the top 50% of competitors at their respective regional championships (i.e. IGB Asian Championships, IGB Canadian Championships, etc.). Prospective participants are also eligible if they finish in the top 25% of their age division on the IGB Championships Qualifying Exam; attain a certain score on that qualifying exam (75 for Varsity; 65 for JV; 55 for Middle/Elementary); or finish in the top 50% at a Regional Quiz Tournament.

Any student who medals at a previous International Geography Championships is automatically eligible for all subsequent IGC competitions.

Events

The majority of the competition events at the International Geography Championships follow a quiz bowl style format (utilizing a lock-out device buzzer system) with students competing individually in the Varsity, Junior Varsity, or Middle School Divisions. Students answer comprehensive, paragraph-length questions about specific topics in geography, depending on the type of competition. The three required events that contribute towards the overall IGB World Championship title are: the Intl. Geo. Quiz Tournament; the Intl. Geography Bowl (which will debut in 2022); and the 400-question Battery Exam.

Some of the events are themed depending on the location of the competition. For instance, in 2018, students participated in a Simulation of the Berlin Conference. Though the location of IGB Worlds has not yet been announced for 2022, events in the lineup include the East Asian Geography Bee and South Asian Geography Bee.

Other unique events include the Scramble, in which the topic is announced only a week before the competition (hence the name).

Affiliation and Medals

All students at the International Geography Championships, like in the International History Olympiad, compete for a US state (if they attend school in the USA or are an American citizen) or for their country of citizenship or residence. Students who would be eligible to compete for two affiliations must select one. Medals are awarded solely to the top three competitors in each event, but they are awarded for every event. A medals table is maintained as well - the ranking is first done by total number of golds, then total number of silvers, then total number of bronzes. Students are also assigned to teams for the team events at the International Geography Championships based on a number of factors, though every effort is made to keep students from the same country or state together. Teams consist of either 2 or 3 students. For team events, if a "mixed" team wins a medal, the medals are credited fractionally on the medals table depending on how many students from a state or country were on the team.

Champions

High School

Varsity

Junior Varsity

Middle school

Elementary

References

Geography competitions
International Academic Competitions